Andrea Adamo (born 25 May 1971 in Turin, Italy), is an Italian engineer and racing manager. He was appointed to the role of Hyundai Shell Mobis WRT team principal in the World Rally Championship in January 2019, replacing Michel Nandan.

Career

References

External links
 Andrea Adamo on Instagram

1971 births
Living people
Italian motorsport people
Automotive engineers from Turin
World Rally Championship people